Doedee or Doedée can refer to:

 Stef Doedée (1987), a Dutch retired goalkeeper and current goalkeeping trainer
 Tom Doedee (1997), an Australian rules footballer